Idan Shum (born 26 March 1976) is a  Israeli former footballer.

References

External links
  Profile and biography of Idan Shum on Maccabi Haifa's official website
  Profile and statistics of Idan Shum on One.co.il

1976 births
Living people
Israeli Jews
Israeli footballers
Hapoel Kfar Saba F.C. players
Hapoel Tzafririm Holon F.C. players
Maccabi Haifa F.C. players
Hapoel Petah Tikva F.C. players
Hapoel Rishon LeZion F.C. players
Maccabi Herzliya F.C. players
Maccabi Netanya F.C. players
Hapoel Haifa F.C. players
FC Spartak Vladikavkaz players
Liga Leumit players
Israeli Premier League players
Expatriate footballers in Russia
Israeli expatriate sportspeople in Russia
Footballers from Kfar Saba
Israel under-21 international footballers
Israeli people of Moldovan-Jewish descent
Association football midfielders